Tokaichi-machi is a Hiroden station on the Hiroden Yokogawa Line and Hiroden Main Line, located in Tokaichi-machi, Naka-ku, Hiroshima. It is operated by the Hiroshima Electric Railway.

Routes
There are six routes that serve Tera-machi Station:
 Hiroshima Station - Hiroden-miyajima-guchi Route
 Hiroden-nishi-hiroshima - Hiroshima Port Route
 Hiroshima Station - Eba Route
 Yokogawa Station - Hiroden-honsha-mae Route
 Yokogawa Station - Eba Route
 Hakushima - Eba Route

Station layout
The station consists of three side platforms. The station is located on an intersection, and the platforms are located on the north, east, and south sides of the intersection. Crosswalks connect the platforms with the sidewalk.

Platforms

Adjacent stations

Surrounding area
Tokaichi Post Office
Ebisu Shrine

History
Opened on November 1, 1917.
Service was stopped on June 10, 1944.
Service restarted on December 26, 1944.

References

See also

Hiroden Streetcar Lines and Routes

Hiroden Main Line stations
Hiroden Yokogawa Line stations
Railway stations in Japan opened in 1917